Yves Roberge is professor of linguistics in the French Department at the University of Toronto. He received a BA in French Studies in 1981 and an MA in linguistics in 1983, both from the University of Sherbrooke, and a PhD in Linguistics from the University of British Columbia in 1986. Roberge has been principal of New College since 2010.

Roberge researches the syntax and semantics of French and other Romance languages, especially Canadian French, as well as dialectal variation, first language acquisition, and the syntax-morphology interface. He is well known for his work on implicit (or silent) arguments, which he has studied from both a theoretical perspective and an acquisition perspective, and which is the subject of his book The Syntactic Recoverability of Null Arguments, published in 1990.

In 2015, Roberge received the National Achievement Award presented by the Canadian Linguistic Association.

References

Year of birth missing (living people)
Living people
Linguists from Canada
Academic staff of the University of Toronto
Université de Sherbrooke alumni
University of British Columbia alumni